The Every Boy's Library: Boy Scout Edition refers to a collection of 73 books that were published under the backing of the Boy Scouts of America. Every title was selected by the Scouts Library Commission, and were branded towards Scouts and included themes that would be of interest to young boys in the Scouting movement.  These re-released many classic novels as well as newer works by those associated with the Scouting movement, include Ernest Thompson Seton and Daniel Carter Beard. This series of reprints was published by Grosset & Dunlap from 1911 with reprints and editions lasting until the mid-1930s. Each edition includes a letter "To The Public" by then Chief Scout Executive James E. West. 30 original works were commissioned, as referenced by the original list in the back page of each edition.

Many books in the library feature an olive-green, linen fabric hard cover and bears a seal red and black fleur-de-lis Boy Scout emblem over two crossed signal flags, with the title at the top and author on the bottom. Some works included an original dust jacket, however intact copies are increasingly rare. There are also several versions that do not display a BSA seal, but rather have different colored hardcovers with or without and embossed seal on the spine. The series was sold as a fundraiser for the BSA, and were sold for fifty cents each. They are currently valued on average at ten dollars to most collectors.

Updated texts are available outlining the complete collection, however Boy Scout collectors frequently reference the rare Kahunas Katalog of the Every Boy's Library – privately published by Joseph Pratt Price, Jr. in 1990. This 538-page scholarly work of investigative bibliographical research provides extensive notes and detailed explanations of variations, printings and editions of all 73 titles in the series. It includes an explanation of the history of the series originally intended as a method of fund raising by the Boy Scouts of America. This work also includes a guide for estimating values of the books in this series, however it has remained elusive as many Boy Scout collectors refuse to share or assimilate the copyrighted work.

References 

Literature of the Boy Scouts of America
1911 books